Diggers Rest (formerly Diggers' Rest) is a suburb in Melbourne, Victoria, Australia,  north-west of Melbourne's Central Business District, located within the Cities of Hume and Melton local government areas. Diggers Rest recorded a population of 5,669 at the 2021 census.

Diggers Rest lies on the Old Calder Highway, near the Calder Freeway.

History

Diggers Rest began life as a stopping place on the road to the Bendigo goldfields, with the Post Office opening on 18 June 1860. Caroline Chisholm started a women's shelter in the area. The town grew in the 1870s and 1880s and became a postal village with a general store, post office, weighbridge, mechanics' institute and a chaff mill. The Diggers Rest Hotel was built by 1854, and later enlarged, and became an important stopping place on the route to the goldfields. It was severely damaged by fire in 2012.

Diggers Rest is sometimes erroneously referred to as being famous for being the location of the first controlled powered flight of an aeroplane undertaken in Australia. The flight was performed by Harry Houdini in 1910. This was however preceded by 2 other flights. The only café in town is named in his honour.

To the north of Diggers Rest township within the locality is the former township known as Aitken's Gap, The Gap or Buttlejorrk.

Sunbury Rock Festival

The four Sunbury Pop Festivals were held on the same 620-acre (2.5 km2) private farm along Jacksons Creek, on the southern outskirts of Sunbury, between Sunbury and Diggers Rest. The property was owned by farmer and local identity George Duncan, and the property has become known in the district over the years simply as "Duncan's farm". The entrance gates to the Sunbury Pop Festivals was off Watsons Road. Also because of its close proximity (2 km; 1.2 mi) to the smaller township of Diggers Rest, many of the attendees who traveled to Sunbury by train, actually alighted at Diggers Rest railway station, and not Sunbury.

Present day

Diggers Rest contains a general store, a primary school and a CFA fire station, along with three large recreation reserves. Sporting groups in Diggers Rest include Diggers Rest Football Club, who play in the Riddell District Football League.

Diggers Rest Primary School was first opened in 1882 and moved to its present site in 1990. Diggers Rest Primary School features excellent facilities including air conditioned and heated classrooms, computer and Internet access to all grades, modern sports and playground equipment and landscaped grounds. Diggers Rest Primary School is an integral part of the wider community and hosts annual events such as the Community Carols, Billy Cart Derby and Grandparents' Day.

Other facilities in the Diggers Rest area include the Holden Flora and Fauna Reserve, Animal Land Children's Farm and SPSK Jadran, and a Slovenian social club which services nearby St Albans and Keilor.

Diggers Rest also has a Scout Group containing Cub Scouts and Scouts. They meet at the Diggers Rest Reserve behind the tennis club rooms.

Transport

Diggers Rest has a railway station on the Sunbury line, connecting the town with Melbourne's CBD.

A bus route connects Diggers Rest with Moonee Ponds and nearby Sunbury, at the former Victoria University campus.

See also
 Shire of Bulla – Parts of Diggers Rest were previously within this former local government area.
 Harry Houdini: The Aviator — Houdini's flight at Diggers Rest, Friday, 18 March 1910.

References

External links
 Diggers Rest (Australian Gazetteer)
 Animal Land Children's Farm

Towns in Victoria (Australia)
Suburbs of the City of Hume
Suburbs of the City of Melton